Al Khuwayr is an abandoned village in northwest Qatar, located in the municipality of Ash Shamal. It is a popular domestic tourist attraction due to its history and ruined structures.

History

Prior to the 19th century
Al Khuwayr was previously known as Khor Hassan, literally meaning 'beautiful inlet'. In the late 18th century, noted pirate and tribal leader Rahmah ibn Jabir al-Jalahimah settled Al Khuwayr. It served as his base of operations against the Al Khalifa in Bahrain. Rahmah's base in Al Khuwayr was surrounded by a protected bay which rendered the area a difficult target for his enemies to attack. He resided in a fort with mud walls and there were only a few huts in the vicinity.

19th century
Abu Al-Qassim Munshi, a British resident in Qatar, wrote a memo regarding the districts of Qatar in 1872. In it, he mentions that "in the year 1218 [1803 in the Gregorian calendar], Khor Hassan was ruled by the Al-e-Kbeiseh", ,.

In the 1820s, George Barnes Brucks carried out the first British survey of the Persian Gulf. He recorded the following notes about Al Khuwayr, which at that time was known as Khor Hassan:

20th century
J.G. Lorimer's Gazetteer of the Persian Gulf gives an account of Al Khuwayr in 1908:

Al Khuwayr was among the villages occupied by Abdullah bin Jassim Al Thani's forces in July 1937 during his military expedition against the kubaisi tribe, whom he considered to be defectors to Bahrain.

Geography

To the immediate north of Al Khuwayr is an island called Al Khuwayr Island.

Education
The settlement's first formal school was opened in 1957.

Notable residents
Qatari ibn al-Fuja'a, 7th century Arab poet and Khariji leader
Rahmah ibn Jabir al-Jalahimah, 18th–19th century pirate and transitory ruler of Qatar

Gallery

References

Populated places in Al Shamal